Engenho da Rainha Station is a subway station on the Rio de Janeiro Metro that services the neighbourhood of Engenho da Rainha in the North Zone of Rio de Janeiro.

References

Metrô Rio stations
Railway stations opened in 1991
1991 establishments in Brazil